Roberto Marcora (born 30 August 1989) is an Italian tennis player.

Marcora has a career high ATP singles ranking of 150 achieved on 17 February 2020. He also has a career high ATP doubles ranking of 717 achieved on 8 July 2013.

Marcora made his ATP main draw debut at the 2017 Geneva Open as a qualifier, defeating Pere Riba and Marco Chiudinelli in qualifying. He was defeated by Mikhail Kukushkin in the first round.

At 2020 Maharashtra Open, he qualified for main draw where he earned his first ATP tour level win. In the second round, he upset top seed Benoit Paire to enter his first quarterfinal at an ATP tour event. He was defeated by Australian player James Duckworth.

Challenger and Futures finals

Singles: 23 (11–12)

Doubles: 4 (1–3)

References

External links
 
 

1989 births
Italian male tennis players
Living people
People from Busto Arsizio
Sportspeople from the Province of Varese
21st-century Italian people